Esporte Clube Nacional, commonly known as Nacional, is a Brazilian football club based in Cruz Alta, Rio Grande do Sul state.

History
The club was founded on March 17, 1941. They won the Campeonato Gaúcho Second Level in 1957.

Achievements
 Campeonato Gaúcho Second Level:
 Winners (1): 1957

Stadium
Esporte Clube Nacional play their home games at Estádio do Morro dos Ventos Uivantes. The stadium has a maximum capacity of 1,200 people.

References

Association football clubs established in 1941
Football clubs in Rio Grande do Sul
1941 establishments in Brazil